Mathias Schamp is a Belgian footballer who plays as a striker or left winger for Sint-Eloois-Winkel.

References

External links
 

1988 births
Association football forwards
Belgian footballers
Belgian expatriate footballers
Expatriate footballers in the Netherlands
Eredivisie players
Heracles Almelo players
K.S.C. Lokeren Oost-Vlaanderen players
K.M.S.K. Deinze players
Living people
People from Zottegem
Sint-Eloois-Winkel Sport players
K.V.K. Ninove players
Footballers from East Flanders